Poly(rC)-binding protein 4 is a protein that in humans is encoded by the PCBP4 gene.

This gene encodes a member of the KH domain protein subfamily. Proteins of this subfamily, also referred to as alpha-CPs, bind to RNA with a specificity for C-rich pyrimidine regions. Alpha-CPs play important roles in post-transcriptional activities and have different cellular distributions. This gene is induced by the p53 tumor suppressor, and the encoded protein can suppress cell proliferation by inducing apoptosis and cell cycle arrest in G(2)-M. This gene's protein is found in the cytoplasm, yet it lacks the nuclear localization signals found in other subfamily members. Multiple alternatively spliced transcript variants have been described, but the full-length nature for only some has been determined.

References

Further reading